"Lif" is a song by French rapper SCH. It was released on 27 October 2022, as a single from his second mixtape Autobahn and peaked atop the French Singles Chart.

Charts

References

2022 songs
2022 singles
French-language songs
Number-one singles in France
SCH (rapper) songs